is a city located in the western portion of Tokyo Metropolis, Japan. , the city had an estimated population of 85,294, and a population density of 6400 persons per km².

Geography
Higashiyamato is approximately in the north-center of Tokyo Metropolis, on the Musashino Terrace, bordered by Saitama Prefecture to the north.

Surrounding municipalities
Tokyo Metropolis
Higashimurayama
Musashimurayama
Tachikawa
Kodaira
Saitama Prefecture
Tokorozawa, Saitama

Climate
Higashiyamato has a Humid subtropical climate (Köppen Cfa) characterized by warm summers and cool winters with light to no snowfall.  The average annual temperature in Higashiyamato is 13.9 °C. The average annual rainfall is 1647 mm with September as the wettest month. The temperatures are highest on average in August, at around 25.4 °C, and lowest in January, at around 2.5 °C.

Demographics
Per Japanese census data, the population of Higashiyamato increased rapidly in the 1970s.

History
The area of present-day Higashiyamato was part of ancient Musashi Province. In the post-Meiji Restoration cadastral reform of April 1, 1889, Takagi Village was established within Kitatama District of Kanagawa Prefecture.  The entire district was transferred to the control of Tokyo Prefecture on April 1, 1893. Takagi Village merged with five neighboring villages to form Yamato Village on November 1, 1919. It was elevated to town status on May 3, 1954 and renamed as Higashiyamato on its promotion to a city, on October 1, 1970.

There was a Hitachi Aircraft Company factory located in Higashiyamato during World War II. It was destroyed by US bombing raids. The Former Hitachi Aircraft Tachikawa Factory Transformer Substation was damaged during air attacks but remains as a war memorial.

Government
Higashiyamato has a mayor-council form of government with a directly elected mayor and a unicameral city council of 22 members. Higashiyamato, collectively with Higashimurayama and Musashimurayama contributes three members to the Tokyo Metropolitan Assembly. In terms of national politics, the city is part of Tokyo 20th district of the lower house of the Diet of Japan.

Economy
Higashiyamato is primary a regional commercial center, and a bedroom community for central Tokyo.

Education
The city's two public high schools are operated by the Tokyo Metropolitan Government Board of Education.
 
 

Higashiyamato has ten public elementary schools and five public junior high schools, operated by the city.

Municipal junior high schools:
 No. 1 (第一中学校)
 No. 2 (第二中学校)
 No. 3 (第三中学校)
 No. 4 (第四中学校)
 No. 5 (第五中学校)

Municipal elementary schools:
 No. 1 (第一小学校)
 No. 2 (第二小学校)
 No. 3 (第三小学校)
 No. 4 (第四小学校)
 No. 5 (第五小学校)
 No. 6 (第六小学校)
 No. 7 (第七小学校)
 No. 8 (第八小学校)
 No. 9 (第九小学校)
 No. 10 (第十小学校)

Transportation

Railway
 - Seibu Railway – Seibu Haijima Line
  
 Tama Toshi Monorail Line
  -  -

Highway
Higashiyamato is not served by any national highway.

Sister city relations
 – Yamato, Fukushima, Japan

Notable people from Higashiyamato
Yūya Yagira, actor
Hisashi Iwakuma, professional baseball player
Akihiro Hayashi, professional soccer player

References

External links

Higashiyamato City Official Website 

 
Cities in Tokyo
Western Tokyo